Ain-bessem is a suburb of the city of Algiers in northern Algeria.

References

Populated places in Algiers Province
Suburbs of Algiers